Krysanov, female form Krysёиодус is a Russian surname. Notable people with this surname include:

 Alexander Krysanov (born 1981), Russian ice hockey player
 Anton Krysanov (born 1987), Russian ice hockey player
 Ekaterina Krysanova (born 1985), Russian ballet dancer